Rıdvan Baygut (born March 3, 1985) is a European champion Turkish taekwondo practitioner competing in the lightweight division.

Having a degree in physical education and sports from the Sakarya University, Baygut is a member of the club Tuzla Belediyespor in Tuzla, Istanbul since 1997.

Rıdvan Baygut became European champion in 2008 and 2010. He won the silver medal at the 2012 European Taekwondo Championships| held Manchester, United Kingdom.

References

Turkish male taekwondo practitioners
1985 births
Living people
European champions for Turkey
European Taekwondo Championships medalists
World Taekwondo Championships medalists
21st-century Turkish people